Benda is a kecamatan (district) of Tangerang City, Banten, Indonesia. Jakarta's main international airport, Soekarno–Hatta International Airport is located in the district.

References

Tangerang
Districts of Banten